Forres is one of the eight wards used to elect members of the Moray Council. It elects four Councillors.

Councillors

Election Results

2022 Election
2022 Moray Council election

2017 Election
2017 Moray Council election

2012 Election
2012 Moray Council election

2010 by-election

2007 Election
2007 Moray Council election

References

Wards of Moray
Forres